Beendorf is a municipality in the Börde district in Saxony-Anhalt, Germany.

History 
During World War II a concentration camp was established in Beendorf. It was a subcamp to the Neuengamme concentration camp. From February 1944 until April 1945 about 2,500 women were forced to work in a pit. It was part of the armament factories for the German Luftwaffe.

References

External links 

Website of the camp memorial

Municipalities in Saxony-Anhalt
Neuengamme concentration camp
Börde (district)